Berezovka is a rural locality (a village) in Chernushinsky District, Perm Krai, Russia. The population was 26 as of 2010. There are 2 streets.

Geography 
Berezovka is located 22 km northeast of Chernushka (the district's administrative centre) by road. Bogatovka is the nearest rural locality.

References 

Rural localities in Chernushinsky District